The men's 1500 metres event at the 2019 African Games was held on 29 and 30 August in Rabat.

Medalists

Results

Heats
Qualification: First 4 in each heat (Q) and the next 4 fastest (q) advanced to the final.

Final

References

1500
African Games